Oyan, Qazaqstan (OQ) is a civil rights movement founded in Almaty, Kazakhstan.

Creation
The formation of Oyan, Qazaqstan was announced 5 June 2019, triggered by the arrest, trial and conviction of activists Beybarys Tolymbekov and Asya Tulesova. The group's name is based on a poetry book written by Mirjaqip Dulatuli (Mir Yakub Dulatov) in 1909 that was immediately confiscated by the Tsarist authorities, "a celebrated verse of defiance". The hashtag "#IWokeUp" video meme campaign involving actor and activist Anuar Nurpeisov, released the previous week, was a factor in the creation of OQ.

Aims
Oyan, Qazaqstan's concerns are fundamental political reform and human rights. OQ is not a political party and does not seek political power for itself. It refuses cooperation with political parties in Kazakhstan and elsewhere. OQ published a nine-point list of its specific aims, including "an end to political repression, reforming the distribution of power between the branches of government, free elections in line with international standards, and a system of self-governance at the local level".

Actions
OQ has been involved in several of the 2019 Kazakh protests. On 30 August 2019, Kazakhstan's Constitution Day, OQ staged rallies in several cities around the country.

References

See also
Respublika – another Kazakh activist organisation created in 2019

External links 
 

Political organizations based in Kazakhstan
Human rights organisations based in Kazakhstan
2019 establishments in Kazakhstan